Boris Andreyevich Arkadyev (21 September 1899 – 17 October 1986) was a Russian footballer and a coach. He became the first coach of the Soviet Union national football team. Merited Master of Sports of the USSR (1942), Merited Coach of the USSR (1957).

Coaching career
Among teams of masters that he coached are included Metallurg Moscow (1937–1939), Dinamo Moscow (1940–1944), CDSA Moscow (1944–1952), Lokomotiv Moscow (1953–1957 and 1963–1965), CSK MO Moscow (1958–1959), Neftyanık Baku (1961–1962), Pakhtakor Tashkent (1967), Neftyanik Fergana (1968) and FC Shinnik Yaroslavl (1969).

He also was a coach of the Soviet Union Olympic football team in 1952. In 1952 he had his title Merited Master of Sports of the USSR stripped, but it was reinstated back in 1955.

Boris had a twin brother Vitaliy Arkadiev (1899-1987) who was Merited Coach of the USSR in fencing.

Honours

Player
Metallurg Moscow
Moscow Championship (2): 1932 (autumn), 1933 (autumn)

Manager
Dynamo Moscow
Soviet Top League (1): 1940

CSKA Moscow
Soviet Top League (5): 1946, 1947, 1948, 1950, 1951
Soviet Cup (3): 1945, 1948, 1951

Lokomotiv Moscow
Soviet Cup (1): 1957

Awards
  Order of the Badge of Honour: 1957

Managerial statistics

References

External links
 
 Profile on rusteam.permian.ru 
  

1899 births
1986 deaths
Sportspeople from Narva
People from Yamburgsky Uyezd
Russian footballers
Soviet footballers
Association football midfielders
Soviet football managers
Soviet Union national football team managers
FC Dynamo Moscow managers
PFC CSKA Moscow managers
FC Lokomotiv Moscow managers
Neftçi PFK managers
Pakhtakor Tashkent FK managers
FC Shinnik Yaroslavl managers
Merited Coaches of the Soviet Union
Honoured Masters of Sport of the USSR